Lieutenant-Colonel Arthur Stanley Meek CMG (7 October 1883 – 14 August 1955) was a British Indian Army and Indian Political Service officer.

Meek was born in Larne, Ireland, the son of a clergyman. He was educated at Bedford School and the Royal Military College, Sandhurst and was commissioned in 1903. In 1907 he joined the Bombay Political Department. He served as Military Governor of Basra from 1917 to 1919, for which he was mentioned in dispatches, and undertook a special mission to Tehama in Yemen in 1919, for which he was appointed Companion of the Order of St Michael and St George (CMG) in January 1920. His final post was as Agent to the Governor-General in the Eastern States Agency from 1934 to 1937. He retired in 1938.

Footnotes

References
Who Was Who

1883 births
1955 deaths
People from Larne
People educated at Bedford School
Graduates of the Royal Military College, Sandhurst
British Indian Army officers
Indian Political Service officers
Companions of the Order of St Michael and St George